Sir George Andrew Joy  (20 February 1896 – 25 April 1974) was a British colonial administrator. He served as British Resident Commissioner of the New Hebrides from 1927 until 1940 and as Governor of Saint Helena from 1947 until 1953.

Biography
Born in London, Joy attended St Francis Xavier's College in Bruges. During World War I he served in the British Army, fighting in the Flanders region. In 1924 he joined the Colonial and Foreign Office, and was appointed Assistant Resident Commissioner for the New Hebrides, where his fluency in French (learnt at school) was an asset in the joint rule with France. Four year later he was promoted to Resident Commissioner, also becoming Consul for the Western Pacific, and joint Consul for the Hoorn and Wallis Islands.

Joy remained in post in the New Hebrides until 1940, when he was appointed Resident Adviser to two sultans in Aden Protectorate, Saleh bin Ghalib Al-Qu'aiti of Qu'aiti and Dscha'far ibn al-Mansur al-Kathir of Kathiri. In 1942 he became Civil Secretary in the Colony of Aden government. He was made a Companion of the Order of St Michael and St George in 1945.

Joy was subsequently appointed Governor of Saint Helena in 1947. In the 1949 Birthday Honours he was made a Knight Commander of the Order of the British Empire. He retired in 1953. After retiring, he founded the Strutt Research Fund alongside Arthur Strutt and W.H. Salter. He also became treasurer and secretary of the Society for Psychical Research.

He died in April 1974.

References

1896 births
Civil servants from London
British Army personnel of World War I
Civil servants in the Foreign Office
Resident Commissioners of the New Hebrides (United Kingdom)
Colony of Aden people
Aden Protectorate people
Governors of Saint Helena
British colonial governors and administrators in Africa
British colonial governors and administrators in Oceania
Companions of the Order of St Michael and St George
Knights Commander of the Order of the British Empire
1974 deaths